This list ranks skyscrapers/high rise buildings and structures in the state of California by height. Additionally Long Beach has one building over 400 feet (not yet listed on this page.)

Buildings over 500 feet

The tallest building in San Diego rises exactly 500 feet due to restrictions imposed by the Federal Aviation Administration (FAA) in the 1970s, because of the downtown's proximity to San Diego International Airport.

Buildings from 400 to 500 feet

Timeline of tallest buildings in California

See also
List of tallest buildings in Los Angeles
List of tallest buildings in San Francisco
List of tallest buildings in Sacramento
List of tallest buildings in Oakland
List of tallest buildings in Long Beach
List of tallest buildings in San Diego
List of tallest buildings in San Jose

References

Tallest buildings
 
 Lists
California